Alastair Robertson Goodlad, Baron Goodlad  (born 4 July 1943) is a British politician who served as Chief Whip of the House of Commons from 1995 to 1997 and British High Commissioner to Australia from 2000 to 2005. A member of the Conservative Party, he was Member of Parliament (MP) for Eddisbury, formerly Northwich, from February 1974 to 1999.

Early life
Born in 1943, Goodlad attended Marlborough College and read law at King's College, Cambridge.

Parliamentary career
Goodlad first stood for Parliament in 1970 when he contested Crewe, but was beaten by Labour's Scholefield Allen.

He was Member of Parliament successively for Northwich (1974–83) and Eddisbury (1983–99), Goodlad also served as a junior Foreign Office Minister then as Prime Minister John Major's Parliamentary Secretary to the Treasury and Chief Whip for which in the 1997 Prime Minister's Resignation Honours he was knighted as a Knight Commander of the Order of St. Michael and St. George (KCMG). Following the 1997 election, he served in the Shadow Cabinet as Shadow Leader of the House of Commons, Shadow Secretary of State for International Development and Opposition Chief Whip.

Membership of Lloyd's of London
Goodlad was an underwriting member of the Lloyd's of London insurance market, commencing in 1977 and ceasing in 1990. His membership coincided in the latter years with the rising tide of asbestos losses and his share is estimated to have been about £90,000.

High Commissioner to Australia
Labour Prime Minister Tony Blair then appointed Goodlad as High Commissioner to Australia.  Goodlad accepted the office of Steward and Bailiff of the Chiltern Hundreds on 28 June 1999 to formally vacate his parliamentary seat, triggering the 1999 Eddisbury by-election.

Goodlad took up office as High Commissioner in 2000. At the end of his term in 2005, he was replaced by former Secretary of State for Scotland, Helen Liddell.

House of Lords
On 19 July 2005, he was created a life peer as Baron Goodlad, of Lincoln in the County of Lincolnshire, and was introduced in the House of Lords the following day. He sits on the Conservative benches and was chairman of the Constitution Select Committee from 2008 to 2010.

In 2007, Goodlad was appointed Chairman of the Britain–Australia Society.

Personal life
Goodlad married Cecilia Hurst in 1968 and has two sons.

Notes

External links
"The Shadow Cabinet" – BBC Election '97
"Another Tory wooed by Blair" – BBC News
 

|-

|-

|-

|-

|-

|-

|-

|-

|-

1943 births
Alumni of King's College, Cambridge
Conservative Party (UK) MPs for English constituencies
Conservative Party (UK) life peers
Diplomatic peers
High Commissioners of the United Kingdom to Australia
Knights Commander of the Order of St Michael and St George
Living people
Members of the Privy Council of the United Kingdom
People educated at Marlborough College
Treasurers of the Household
UK MPs 1974
UK MPs 1974–1979
UK MPs 1979–1983
UK MPs 1983–1987
UK MPs 1987–1992
UK MPs 1992–1997
UK MPs 1997–2001
Life peers created by Elizabeth II